Nyctalus velutinus alphacoronavirus SC-2013 is a species of coronavirus in the genus Alphacoronavirus.

References

Alphacoronaviruses